The 1913 Tour de France was the 11th edition of the Tour de France, taking place between 29 June and 27 July. The competition was won by the Belgian Philippe Thys, after in the crucial sixth stage Eugène Christophe broke his bicycle and lost several hours because he had to do the repairs by himself. In the last stage, Thys also had mechanical problems, but he got help during the repairs, and only got a penalty of ten minutes.

Between 1904 and 1912, the overall classification had been calculated by points, but in 1913 the classification was reverted to the original format from 1903, where the overall classification was calculated by adding up the times of the individual stages. The general classification has been calculated in the time format ever since.

Innovations and changes
In 1905, the format of the Tour de France had been changed from the time system to the points system, to reduce the cheating that had caused the first four cyclists of the 1904 Tour de France to be disqualified. In the 1912 Tour de France, this system had been working against Eugène Christophe's chances, who would have been leading the time classification up until the final stage where he allowed a group to ride away. The system had been working against a French cyclist and in favor of a Belgian cyclist (Odiel Defraye, who won the Tour de France in 1912), and the French organisation changed the system back again to the time system: the finishing times of all stages were added per cyclist, and the cyclist with the least total time was the winner. This was also intended to increase combativity, because in the points system riders did not care about time gaps, so escaped low-ranked riders were ignored by high-ranked cyclists.

For the first time, the route of the race was in the opposite direction. Prior to the 1913 race, the Tour the France always had been in the clockwise direction through France, and in 1913 it was anticlockwise.

Teams

The 1913 Tour started with 140 cyclists; there were 51 cyclists distributed over 9 teams, including all favourites for the overall victory. The remaining 89 cyclists started in the isolés category. Stage results This edition started with six former Tour de France winners (Louis Trousselier, Lucien Petit-Breton, François Faber, Octave Lapize, Gustave Garrigou and Odile Defraye), the most ever.

Although cyclists had started in teams previously, the rules had forbidden them to work together against other cyclists. In 1913, this changed, and cyclists from the same team were allowed to work together. The organisers preferred riders to ride solo, so they added a rule that if a cyclist would win a stage with a margin of 20 minutes or more, he would not only get his own prize money, but also the half of all the other cyclists' prize money of that stage.

The first African cyclist took part in the Tour de France in 1913: Ali Neffati from Tunisia. Neffati had been discovered by Tour organiser Henri Desgrange, and would later become a driver at l'Auto, the newspaper that organised the Tour de France.

Race overview

In the first stages, not much happened in the overall classification, as most cyclists were saving their energy for the Pyrenees. The stage was won by Italian Giovanni Micheletto in a sprint. Micheletto was not part of the first group in the second stage, and thus lost his lead. There were four cyclists who had been in the lead group in both stages, and they were jointly leading the Tour.

The most important event occurred in the third stage, when former winner Lapize stopped the race; either because he considered his earning insufficient, or because he thought his team was not good enough.

The crucial stage proved to be the sixth. At the start of the sixth stage, last year's winner Defraye led the general classification, some 5 minutes ahead of Eugène Christophe. In that sixth stage, the first mountains were climbed. Defraye was dropped quickly, and Christophe led the race. Christophe came up first on the Aubisque, and in second place behind Philippe Thys on the Tourmalet. On the way down from the Tourmalet, Christophe was hit by a race vehicle, and his fork broke, rendering his bike unusable, and the rules said that he had to repair it himself. He walked more than 10 km down to the next village, and found a place where he could repair his bicycle. He worked on it for over three hours, being watched by race officials who made sure that he was not helped by anyone. When Christophe asked a small boy, of seven years old, to work the bellows, he was fined with ten minutes. During this repair, angry with the draconian rules, he snapped: (at the hungry race commissaires) "If you're hungry, eat charcoal! [...] I am your prisoner and you will remain my wardens till the end". After his bicycle was fixed, he rode away and finished the stage, 3 hours and 50 minutes later than the stage winner Thys. Christophe's chances to win the 1913 Tour de France were over.

After that sixth stage, Marcel Buysse was in the lead. In the ninth stage, Buysse had mechanical failure with a broken handlebar, and finished almost three and a half hours after stage winner Lambot. This was the end of the chances for Buysse for the victory. Buysse did not give up, and won four of the remaining five stages.

The lead had transferred to Thys now. In the last stages, the race focussed on the duel between Petit-Breton and Thys. In the 14th stage, Petit-Breton fell down and stopped the race. In the same stage, Thys also fell down and remained unconscious for a while. When he was conscious again, he was helped to repair his bicycle. All help was illegal in 1913, but the jury only gave him a 10-minute penalty. Thys finished the stage, and kept 8'37" in front of Gustave Garrigou in the general classification. In the final stage, Thys stayed with Garrigou, and so won the 1913 Tour de France.

Results

Stage winners

General classification

For each cyclist, the times they had needed in each stage was added up for the general classification. The cyclist with the least accumulated time after the last stage was the winner. Of the 140 starting cyclists, 25 finished.

In the points system that had been used in previous years in the Tour de France, Garrigou would have won the race with 45 points, followed by Buysse with 48 points; Thys would have been third with 57 points.

Other classifications

Camillo Bertarelli, ranked 8 in the general classification, became the winner of the "isolés" category. The "isolés" classification was calculated in the same way as the general classification, but only the isolated cyclists (not part of a team) were eligible.

The organising newspaper l'Auto named Philippe Thys the meilleur grimpeur. This unofficial title is the precursor to the mountains classification.

Notes

References

Bibliography

External links

 
Tour de France
Tour de France by year
Tour de France
Tour de France
Tour de France